The Pointe aux Chenes Formation is a geologic formation in Michigan, USA. It preserves fossils dating back to the Silurian period.

References
 

Silurian Michigan
Silurian southern paleotemperate deposits